"Reunited" is a hit song for R&B vocal duo Peaches & Herb. As the second single release from their album, 2 Hot (1978), the song was a huge crossover smash, topping both the pop and soul charts. It spent four weeks at number one on both the R&B singles chart and the Billboard Hot 100 singles chart in 1979 and sold over two million copies. Billboard ranked it as the No. 5 song for 1979. In Canada, "Reunited" likewise reached number one and was the No. 9 song for the year.

The song was written by Dino Fekaris and Freddie Perren. It was the sequel to the duo's 1968 hit "(We'll Be) United", performed with the original Peaches, which was itself a cover of The Intruders' original 1966 hit.

Chart performance

Weekly charts

Year-end charts

All-time charts

Sales and certifications

Cover versions
 A version by Louise Mandrell and R. C. Bannon reached #13 on the Hot Country Singles chart in 1979.
 It was regularly covered by Faith No More as the intro song to the live shows on their 2009/2010 reunion tour.
 It was sung by David Hasselhoff at the fall of the Berlin Wall in 1989.
 Lulu recorded a version with Cliff Richard for her album Together (2002).
 Raven-Symoné and Bobb'e J. Thompson sang "Reunited" in the season 3 episode of That's So Raven, "The Grill Next Door" (2005).

Sampled versions
 South Korean rapper Cho PD sampled in "First Love" (첫사랑) from the album Money Talks (2007).

Uses in popular culture
 It appears in the TV series Son of the Beach, Haven, Grounded for Life, King of the Hill, Raising Hope, Brooklyn Nine-Nine, That '70s Show and was also used as the theme for the BBC TV series Stars Reunited between 2003 and 2004.
 It also appears in the comedy movie Dudley Do-Right (1999).
 The song featured in the comedy movie Stealing Harvard (2002) for the scenes where the lonely widower judge forces some unsuspecting man to wear his late wife's dress and spoon with him.
 The song appeared on the September 16, 2019 episode of ESPN's Monday Night Countdown about Odell Beckham Jr.'s return to MetLife Stadium as a member of the Cleveland Browns.
 It appears in episode 7 of season 1 of the BBC time travel procedural television series Ashes to Ashes, originally broadcast on March 20, 2009.
 It is featured as the song for a spring 2021 Saint Louis Zoo commercial, welcoming guests back to the zoo after winter during the COVID-19 pandemic.

References

External links
 Lyrics of this song
 

1979 singles
1978 songs
1970s ballads
Peaches & Herb songs
R.C. Bannon songs
Louise Mandrell songs
Billboard Hot 100 number-one singles
Cashbox number-one singles
RPM Top Singles number-one singles
Male–female vocal duets
Songs written by Freddie Perren
Songs written by Dino Fekaris
Polydor Records singles
Rhythm and blues ballads